Ajit Ninan (born 1955 in Hyderabad, India) is an Indian political cartoonist, best known for drawing the Centrestage series of cartoons in India Today magazine and Ninan's World in the Times of India.

Ninan lives in New Delhi, where he works for the Times of India.

Work

Comic strips
 Detective Moochhwala, published in Target magazine.

Cartoons
 Ajit Ninan's Funny World, published in Target magazine
 Just Like That! published daily in the Times Of India. 
 Like That Only! (along with Jug Suraiya), published bi-weekly in the Times Of India.
 Centrestage, published in India Today
 Ninan's World, published in the Times of India
 Poli Tricks, a series of cartoons during the 2009 Indian general elections, published in the Times of India
 : a single panel cartoon strip in The Times of India - with Sunil Agarwal

Books
 
 Ninan, Ajit, and Sudeep Chakravarti (eds.). The India Today Book of Cartoons. New Delhi: Books Today, 2000.

References 

Writers from Hyderabad, India
Living people
1955 births
Indian editorial cartoonists
20th-century Indian essayists
20th-century Indian novelists
Indian male novelists
Novelists from Andhra Pradesh
20th-century Indian male writers